Sashko Pandev (born 1 May 1987) is a Macedonian football player who plays as a striker for Akademija Pandev.

Club career
He is currently playing for Akademija Pandev. He made his Croatian First League debut on 14 October 2006 as a late substitute in Dinamo Zagreb's 4–1 home victory over NK Varteks and scored his first league goal for the club in their 3–2 away victory over Međimurje on 9 December 2006, which was also his first match in Dinamo's starting line-up. One week before the match against Međimurje, he assisted in both goals for Dinamo's 2–1 victory in a Zagreb derby against NK Zagreb, which eventually earned him his first start for Dinamo in a league match.
He spent most of his career in Strumica. He played for Belasica Turnovo and Akademija Pandev. 
He won the Macedonian cup in 2009 with Rabotnichki and 2019 with Akademija Pandev.
He briefly played for Renova Tetovo and Mugan Azerbaijan. 
Although he played in top flight teams competing for titles and cups he didn't win many trophies. 
In his youth career he played for the Macedonian under 21 team.

Personal life
Sashko Pandev is the younger brother of retired Macedonian football international Goran Pandev.

Honours
Macedonian Football Cup 
2019

References

External links
 

1987 births
Living people
Sportspeople from Strumica
Association football forwards
Macedonian footballers
North Macedonia under-21 international footballers
FK Belasica players
GNK Dinamo Zagreb players
NK Inter Zaprešić players
NK Međimurje players
FK Rabotnički players
FK Horizont Turnovo players
FK Mughan players
FK Renova players
Akademija Pandev players
Macedonian First Football League players
Croatian Football League players
Azerbaijan Premier League players
Macedonian expatriate footballers
Expatriate footballers in Croatia
Macedonian expatriate sportspeople in Croatia
Expatriate footballers in Azerbaijan
Macedonian expatriate sportspeople in Azerbaijan
Croatian people of Macedonian descent